A Trip to Coontown is an American musical comedy. It was performed, directed, and produced by African-Americans. It was written and performed in by Bob Cole and Billy Johnson. and debuted it New Jersey in 1897 before touring in the U.S. and internationally. Its New York City debut was at the Third Avenue Theatre on April 4, 1898.

The musical was a reworking of Cole and Johnson's skit "At Jolly Coon-ey Island" which was written by Cole for an operatic variety company called Black Patti’s Troubadours (formed by Sissieretta Jones). A Trip to Coontown spoofed the popular musical A Trip to Chinatown (1891).

In the early 20th century the musical was staged in European cities.

Cast
According to an October 1899 advertisement in The Allentown Leader, the show featured:
Coontown Sextette
Carter and Hillman's Bowery Spielers
Alice MacKay, Contralto
Freeman Sisters, acrobatic dancers
Billy Johnson, "the Luckiest Coon in Town"
Lloyd G. Gibbs, "Famous Colored Tenor"
Edna Alexander, "Accomplished Soprano"
Bob Cole, in his own laughable creations
Sam Lucas, the "Favorite Colored Comedian"

See also
Coon song
Minstrel show

References

External links 
Sheet music for the song "Chicken" from the musical

1898 musicals
African-American plays